Brennan's is a Creole restaurant in the French Quarter of New Orleans, Louisiana.

History
Brennan's was founded in 1946 by Owen Brennan, an Irish-American restaurateur and New Orleans native. It was originally called the Vieux Carré restaurant and was located on Bourbon Street across from the Old Absinthe House until 1956 when it moved to its current location.

This building, a two-story French Quarter mansion at 417 Royal Street constructed in 1795, was built for Don José Faurie and later housed the Banque de la Louisiane, the first bank in Louisiana. From 1841 to 1891, the mansion had been owned by the Morphy family, with Paul Morphy, the celebrated chess player and unofficial world chess champion, living there until his death in 1884. In 1920 William Ratcliffe Irby gave the building to Tulane University  and it was initially leased by Owen Brennan in 1954 to open the following year as Brennan's. The restaurant purchased the building in 1984.

Because Brennan's father owned a share of the restaurant, the restaurant was eventually inherited by Brennan's siblings as well as his children. In 1973, disagreement within the Brennan family over the expansion of the restaurant line led to a split into several different corporations, with the original New Orleans restaurant being wholly owned by Brennan's widow and children, and other restaurants in New Orleans, Houston, and Dallas, the Brennan Family Restaurants, being owned by Brennan's siblings and their children.

Although the section of Royal Street in the French Quarter was spared the flooding suffered by most of the city in the levee failures during Hurricane Katrina in 2005, Brennan's did suffer significant damage, largely due to the contents of second-story refrigerators melting and seeping onto lower floors. The restaurant's extensive wine cellar lost temperature control, ruining the entire wine collection.

Following an extensive renovation, Brennan's re-opened on June 8, 2006. Brennan's closed on June 28, 2013. The new owners of Brennan's, Terry White and Ralph Brennan (a cousin of the former owners) purchased the building and the business at auction(s) after the former owners ran into financial trouble.  For more than a year, the historic building (circa 1795) underwent an extensive renovation. The new Brennan's was unveiled in the fall of 2014.

Cultural references
Brennan's was featured in a season two episode of Ghost Hunters in which the TAPS team investigated claims of paranormal activity.
Rush Limbaugh once stated (in a New York Times interview with Maureen Dowd) that he would sometimes charter a jet and go somewhere for dinner, adding Brennan's was his "all-time favorite restaurant."

See also
 List of Louisiana Creole restaurants

References

External links

Official Site (New Orleans location)
Official Site (Houston Location) (historical)

Louisiana Creole restaurants in the United States
Louisiana Creole culture in New Orleans
Restaurants in New Orleans
French Quarter
Reportedly haunted locations in Louisiana
Restaurants established in 1946
Houses completed in 1795
1946 establishments in Louisiana